Laphriini is a tribe of robber flies in the family Asilidae. There are about 7 genera and at least 80 described species in Laphriini.

Genera
These seven genera belong to the tribe Laphriini.
 Andrenosoma
 Cerotainiops
 Dasylechia
 Lampria
 Laphria (bee-like robber flies)
 Orthogonis
 Pogonosoma

References

Further reading

External links

 
 
 

Laphriinae
Brachycera tribes